Majid Bajelan (born December 4, 1980) is an Iranian Football player and professional  coach who currently plays for Gahar Zagros of the Iran Pro League.

Professional
Bajelan joined Rah Ahan in 2009 after spending the previous years at Zob Ahan F.C. In 2012, he joined Gahar Zagros newly promoted team to Iran Pro League and became team's captain.

Club Career Statistics
Last Update  February 11, 2013 

 Assist Goals

References

1980 births
Living people
Iranian footballers
Zob Ahan Esfahan F.C. players
Rah Ahan players
Persian Gulf Pro League players
Association football defenders